is a town located in Aomori, Japan.

Geography
Ōma occupies the northwestern coastline of Shimokita Peninsula, facing the Tsugaru Strait.  is the northernmost point on the island of Honshū. Much of the town is within the limits of the Shimokita Hanto Quasi-National Park. In 2002, the Ministry of the Environment classified some tidal flats of the Ōma shoreline as one of the 500 Important Wetlands in Japan particularly for its biodiversity of marine flora, especially several varieties of kelp.

Neighbouring municipalities
Aomori Prefecture
Mutsu
Sai
Kazamaura

Climate
The town has a climate characterized by cool short summers and long cold winters with strong winds (Köppen climate classification Cfb).

Demographics
According to Japanese census data, the population of Ōma has declined since 1960.

History
The area around Ōma was inhabited by the Emishi people until the historical period. During the Edo period, it was controlled by the Nambu clan of Morioka Domain. During the post-Meiji restoration establishment of the modern municipalities system on 1 April 1889, Ōoku Village was proclaimed from the merger of Ōma hamlet with neighboring Okudo hamlet. It was renamed Ōma Town on 3 November 1942.

Ōma has been a popular location setting for movies and television dramas. It was the setting for the 1983 movie  starring Ken Ogata. In 2000, Ōma was the setting for an NHK television series  starring Tabata Tomoko. This was followed by another fictional series  on TV Asahi starring Tetsuya Watari in 2007.

Government
Ōma has a mayor-council form of government with a directly elected mayor and a unicameral town council of ten members. Ōma is part of Shimokita District which, together with the city of Mutsu, contributes three members to the Aomori Prefectural Assembly. In terms of national politics, the city is part of Aomori 1st district of the lower house of the Diet of Japan.

Economy

The economy of Ōma was traditionally heavily dependent on commercial fishing. The town was famous for having the "black diamond" of tuna, which are caught in the traditional manner by hand in two-person boats, and sold under the "Ōma" registered brand. One Ōma tuna was sold at a record-high 333.6 million yen in January 2019. Other seafood products include sea urchin roe, konbu and squid.

The town is the site of a nuclear power plant, the Ōma Nuclear Power Plant, which will be unique in its use of MOX fuel when it comes on line.

Education
Ōma has two public elementary schools and one public middle school operated by the town government, and one public high school operated by the Aomori Prefectural Board of Education.

Transportation

Railway
The town has no passenger railway service. The nearest station is Ōminato Station on the JR East Ōminato Line in Mutsu City.

Highway

Local attractions
Ōmazaki, northernmost point on the island of Honshū
Ōmazaki Lighthouse, one of the “50 Lighthouses of Japan”
 Ōma Onsen, hot spring resort
 Akaishi Beach

Sister cities

In Japan
 Hakodate, Hokkaidō

Overseas
 Huwei, Yunlin, Taiwan

Noted people from Ōma
Hiroshi Izumi – silver medalist in judo at the 2004 Summer Olympics

References

External links

Official Website 

 
Towns in Aomori Prefecture
Populated coastal places in Japan